Belíssima is a Brazilian telenovela that was produced and aired by TV Globo between November 7, 2005, and July 7, 2006, as the 8pm telenovela of the station, with a total of 209 chapters. It was written by Sílvio de Abreu in collaboration with Sérgio Marques and Vinícius Vianna, directed by Flávia Lacerda, Gustavo Fernandez and Natália Grimberg, with the general direction of Carlos Araújo, Luiz Henrique Rios and Denise Saraceni. It was produced by Denise Saraceni core, with Carmen Righetto research.

It stars Glória Pires, Fernanda Montenegro, Cláudia Abreu, Carolina Ferraz, Marcello Antony, Cláudia Raia, Reynaldo Gianecchini, Camila Pitanga, Alexandre Borges, Lima Duarte, Irene Ravache and Tony Ramos in the lead roles.

The telenovela was broadcast again on Rede Globo between June 4, 2018 and January 18, 2019, in 161 episodes.

Cast

Reception

Ratings

References

External links
 

2005 telenovelas
2005 Brazilian television series debuts
2006 Brazilian television series endings
Brazilian telenovelas
Brazilian LGBT-related television shows
Portuguese-language telenovelas
TV Globo telenovelas
Japanese-Brazilian culture